Griffith College Dublin  (GCD) is one of the longest-established private third level (higher education) colleges in Dublin, Ireland.

Overview

Established in 1974, with four campuses in Dublin, Cork and Limerick, Griffith College is one of the two largest independent higher education college in Ireland, with a student population of around 7,000 with 1,400 overseas students from over 77 countries. It is named after the former Griffith Barracks on the South Circular Road in Dublin. 

The 7-acre Dublin campus is close to the city centre, where Griffith College has an additional campus. Student Halls of Residence are located on campus, close to the library, creative studios, the student bar and restaurant, gym facilities and the Students Union.

Griffith College runs full and part-time degree and higher education qualifications in Law, Accountancy, Business, Computing Science, Journalism, Media, TV Production, Film Production, Design, Fashion, Music and Drama.

The college offers professional accountancy programmes for Association of Chartered Certified Accountants (ACCA), ACA, CPA and IATI, Griffith College is a goldStar CPA approved Educator. The ACCA has awarded Griffith College Dublin the Platinum accreditation – the highest recognition by the ACCA, and is also an ACCA CPD registered course provider.

The Griffith College Dublin campus is the home of the Leinster School of Music & Drama. Established in 1904, the Leinster School offer theory classes in Music & Drama to groups and individuals subject to availability. The Leinster School is also an examining body and have a Theory Examinations Syllabus with levels from Preparatory to Grade 8.

History 
The college was established in 1974 by Diarmuid Hegarty and incorporated in 1978 as the Business and Accounting Training (BAT). Originally located on Morehampton Road, in 1991 the Business and Accounting College moved from Milltown Park, Ranelagh, Dublin 6, to the Griffith Barracks site changed its name to Griffith College Dublin.In 1979 Griffith College was designated as being an institution under the Irish Government's National Council for Educational Awards (NCEA) Act. In 1990 the first degree course was offered by Griffith College in Computer Science and it was validated by the University of Ulster. In 1992 it was followed by a Business Studies degree, this arrangement ceased in 1996 and the degrees were validated by Irish National Council for Educational Awards (NCEA) the predecessor of HETAC.

In 1992 the Tiernan Design School moved to the Griffith Campus becoming the Griffith College Faculty of Design. In the late 1990s Newman College, Dublin became part of Griffith College.

In 2005, Griffith College Dublin merged with Skerry's College to form Griffith College Cork. Skerry's College had been active in Cork since 1884.

In September 2006 Griffith College Dublin merged with the Mid-West Business Institute to form Griffith College Limerick.

Griffith College City Centre
In 2018, the college opened Griffith College City Centre, off Mary Street in Dublin 1. The Dublin city centre facility offers courses such as Professional Accountancy, BAs in Accounting and Finance and also Business, Diplomas in Business Management and Human Resources Management, a Professional Diploma in Management and Leadership, and a Certificate in Applied IT and Office Skills.

Faculties

The College is divided into a number of faculties:
 Faculty of Business
 Graduate School of Business
 The School of Professional Accountancy
 Faculty of Law
Faculty of Pharmaceutical Science
 The Professional Law School
 Faculty of Computing Science
 Faculty of Journalism & Media Communications
 Faculty of Design
 The Leinster School of Music & Drama
 Faculty of Training & Education
 Corporate Training
 Short Courses
 Griffith Institute of Language

Faculty of Law & the Professional Law School
Griffith College Dublin is home to Ireland's largest law school, incorporating the Undergraduate, Postgraduate and Professional Law Schools.

Innocence Project
In September 2009, David Langwallner, Dean of Law, founded the Irish Innocence Project at Griffith College.

The Irish Innocence Project reviews claims of wrongful conviction and miscarriages of justice in Ireland. It is based on the famous Innocence Project in the USA.

Final-year law students, drawn from Griffith, Trinity College Dublin and DCU, work with qualified and practising barristers, who in turn are working closely with the Griffith Dean of Law, to give post-conviction reviews of cases. Currently there are 20 active files and cases going back before the courts.

The Irish Innocence Project (Irish: Tionscadal Neamhchiontachta na hÉireann) was launched officially by Dr.Greg Hampikian, director of the Idaho Innocence Project and DNA expert for the Georgia Innocence Project in March 2010.

School of Professional Accountancy
Griffith College works with several local and international partners to offer professional courses in areas of accounting.

Association of Chartered Certified Accountants
Griffith College holds a platinum status Association of Chartered Certified Accountants (ACCA) accreditation, and offers courses in the following areas:
 ACCA (Association of Chartered Certified Accountants)
 ACCA - Computer Based Exams
 ACCA Diploma in Accounting & Business

Certified Public Accountants
Griffith College also a Goldstar CPA Approved Educator, offering Certified Public Accountant (CPA) certification and preparation programmes. These include:
 CPA (Certified Public Accountants)
 CPA - Computer Based Exams
 CPA -Certificate in Business & Accounting
 CPA Certified Tax Adviser (CTax)

Accounting Technicians Ireland
Griffith College is a licensed college provider by Accounting Technicians Ireland (ATI) and offers an ATI membership qualification course.

Collaborations and recognition
There are seven publicly funded universities in Ireland, fourteen Institutes of Technology, and a number of independent higher education colleges. Griffith College is one of the latter.

At an international level, Griffith College Dublin is a participant in the Erasmus / Socrates mobility programmes.

Ireland is a member of the Bologna Process, of which Griffith College is a promoter. The generic outcomes for Irish degrees are laid out in the National Framework of Qualifications. In 2006, Ireland became the first country to verify the compatibility of its national framework with the overarching framework of qualifications for the European Higher Education Area (EHEA) and Griffith College’s degree programmes adhere to this framework.

Validating partners
Griffith College works in partnership with a number of validating bodies in Ireland and the UK. This ensures that all programmes are recognised nationally and internationally.

QQI (HETAC) validation
The Higher Education and Training Awards Council (HETAC – now part of QQI) is the awarding body for Irish higher education and training institutions outside the university sector.

HETAC complies with the standards and guidelines set by the European Association for Quality Assurance in Higher Education (ENQA).

King's Inns Recognition
In 2004, Griffith became the first independent college in the country to have its degrees (LLB and BA in Business & Law) recognised by the Honorable Society of King's Inns. for the purposes of admission to its annual entrance examinations. Having successfully completed these five examinations, students may then complete the Barrister of Law degree in one year. which is a professional qualification for practice at the bar.

Student life

Halls of Residence
Overlooking Dublin's Grand Canal, Griffith College was originally an army barracks dating from the 1830s. Griffith Halls of Residence, commonly referred to as GHR) is located on campus and is a new apartment complex. This on-site accommodation can house 160+ students, with 24-hour security and reception. GHR is open to all students living and studying in Dublin, and is not dedicated solely to Griffith students.

GriffFM
During the spring students from the Journalism & Media Faculty operate a radio station from the campus,. The radio station is licensed by the BAI (and the BCI before that) to broadcast for a couple of weeks. This year GriffFM broadcasts on 92.1 FM from 1–15 February and will be relayed online on. The station airs both hard news and music-oriented programmes produced and presented by second year journalism degree students and postgraduate journalism students.

Students' union
Griffith College Students' Union is the representative body for all full-time and part-time Griffith College students. The students' union executive includes the roles of president and (as of 2021) two vice-presidents. The union organises a number of trips and events throughout the academic year, including Freshers Week and several balls. It also helps fund and assist college clubs and societies covering activities such as sport, music, debating, and film. GCD's debating society were team winners of the 2009 Thomas Finlay Court Moot Competition in UCD. The students' union also publishes a magazine which was originally titled Griffiti and later published as Baked Goods. Launched in 2004, the magazine has won several awards at the National Student Media (sMedia) Awards (including a "Small College Publication of the Year" award in 2007).

College and student publications
There are a number of college publications. These include a newspaper published by Journalism students, where examples of student work get published. The paper won the award for Small College Publication of the Year at the annual Oxygen Student Media (sMedia) Awards in 2005 and 2006, while Griffiti won in 2007. The Griff, The Griffin, 90 Degrees and Maverick are other student publications which have been produced by degree, higher diploma and print journalism students in the past. Glór uí Ghríofa (The Voice of Griffith) is the official college newsletter outlining college news, developments and campus life.

Events
An annual "Creative Week" takes place to showcase student work of the creative disciplines, Interior Design, Interior Architecture, Fashion Design, TV & Video production, Photography, Digital Media, Sound Engineering, Journalism and Visual Media.

Facilities and services
The college facilities include a library, common room, computer laboratories (248 workstations across 10 labs), CAD lab, photography lab, fitness room, sound studios, shop and bar & restaurant. The college also offers students a career advice service there is also a professional counsellor off campus providing an advice and counselling for personal and non-academic issues.

The college library provides research and study facilities to students (and to college alumni), the library holds a range of set course texts and background reading material for all college programmes.

Conference centre
Griffith Conference Center is located on the college campus. The facilities include a 575-seat auditorium, as well as smaller suites and rooms for hire. The buildings were officially opened by then Taoiseach Bertie Ahern in September 2006.
The Conference Centre has been used for a variety of functions such as conventions of political parties, medical bodies, and industry groups. It has also hosted television programmes such as the You're a Star auditions.

Notable staff and graduates
 Vincent Browne, journalist and broadcaster, lectured in Journalism and Media at Griffith College Dublin.
 Cecelia Ahern, author, is a Journalism graduate from Griffith College. 
 Laura Woods, RTÉ announcer, is also a Journalism graduate.
 Frank Dunlop, former Irish government press secretary, studied for an LLB in Irish Law, graduating in 2007. 
 Mark Vaughan, Dublin Gaelic footballer, also studied at Griffith College.
 Laura Whitmore, graduate of the LSMD at Griffith College, is a TV Personality and MTV Presenter 
 Maria Walsh, Media and Journalism graduate (2009), won the Rose of Tralee festival in 2014 and was elected as a Member of the European Parliament in 2019. 
 Seán O'Brien, Seán Cronin, Fergus McFadden and Jordan Larmour, all Ireland national rugby union team members, attended the college.
 Michael Conlan, Irish Olympian and professional boxer, attended the college.
 Helen McEntee, Fine Gael TD and Minister for European Affairs, studied Journalism and Media Communications at Griffith.
Emmet McNamara, who won the 2020 Epsom Derby on Serpentine, graduated from the Accounting and Finance program in 2018.

Buildings

 Daniel O'Connell Building – North Wing, International Office, Accounts, DIFC, Admissions, Journalism & Media faculty, Business Faculty.
 Arthur Griffith Building – West Wing, Reception, Lecture Rooms, Library, Fashion Design, Law Faculty, Graduate Business School.
 Meagher Building – houses the Griffith College Students Union
 James Stephens Building – Computer Labs, CAD Labs.
 Richmond Building – Photography Studios, Radio & Sound Engineering Studios.
 Wellington Building – Houses the Faculty of Computing Science, IT Department & Computer Labs.
 Cavalry Buildings – Photography Dark Rooms.
 Stables – Video Editing Studios.
 Academic Facilities Building – Restaurant, Auditorium, Conference Centre, School of Professional Accountancy (Opened in 2006)
 Design Studio (Opened in 2007)

Expansion and developments
Over the years Griffith College has expanded beyond its base in Dublin.

Having previously established its Professional Accountancy Programmes in Cork in 2000, offering training in ACCA, CIMA, CPA and IATI, Griffith College acquired Skerry's College Cork in 2005, forming Griffith College Cork the college runs a variety of full- and part-time courses in Business, Law, Media & Communications, Design, Secretarial and Office skills.

In 2006 Griffith College opened in Limerick with the acquisition of the Mid West Business Institute, creating Griffith College Limerick. In 2009 Griffith College Limerick moved into new premises which were officially opened by the Minister of Defence Willie O'Dea T.D. on 23 January 2009.

There is also one campus based in Moscow which mainly offers accountancy courses.

In 2009 the Professional Law courses were made available completely online – such as the FE1 and IILEX courses.

In Spring 2013 Griffith College Cork expanded to a 5.3 acre campus on Wellington Road, Cork City, on the former site of St. Patrick's Hospital and Marymount Hospice. The Campus is called 'Griffith College Cork, Wellington Road Campus'. Teaching commenced at the Wellington Road campus in Summer 2013 with an English Language Residential School. From August 2013 all evening undergraduate, postgraduate, short-term and professional programmes in the areas of Law, Business, Journalism and Media Communications, Accountancy and Drama moved to the facility.

St. Patrick's Hospital and Marymount Hospice occupied this building until 2011, when, 141 years after it first opened its doors, the institution relocated all of its services to new premises at Curraheen in Cork.

Graduations
The college graduation ceremonies take place over two days each November in the Conference Center. In previous years the ceremony took place in Royal Hospital Kilmainham in 2004 and 2005, and St. Patrick's Cathedral, Dublin the year before that.

The 2002 graduation was addressed by Taoiseach Bertie Ahern, Education Minister Noel Dempsey address the 2003 Graduation and in 2005 justice minister Michael McDowell addressed Law graduates. In attendance are graduates with their families and friends, representatives of Validation Bodies, as well as political and diplomatic dignitaries. At the graduation ceremony there are prizes awarded such as HETAC Student of the Year Award and Best Academic Achievements for each faculty and school.

References

 
Education in Dublin (city)
1974 establishments in Ireland

es:Griffith College